Flea Market Music is an American company which publishes and sells ukulele-related books and music.

History
Flea Market Music was founded in 1992 by Jim Beloff and his wife, Liz Beloff, to publish music books for the ukulele community. A guitarist for many years, Jim bought a used Martin ukulele at a flea market and later left his job with Billboard Magazine to make a full-time career of promoting the ukulele.
The company name combines the meaning of ukulele in Hawaiian, 'jumping flea', and the purchase of Beloff's first ukulele at the Rose Bowl Flea Market.

Flea Market Music has published a wide variety of ukulele instructional books (distributed by the Hal Leonard Corporation) and DVDs as well as CDs of recorded ukulele music.  To date over 600,000 books have been sold.  The company's products are sold through retail and online.

Beloff and his wife, Liz, perform and give workshops at festivals and other musical events to promote ukuleles and the Flea Market Music products. In 2014 they were guests on a WNPR radio show with ukulelist Jake Shimabukuro, discussing ukuleles and ukulele music.

Books 

 Jumpin' Jim's Ukulele Favorites, Flea Market Music, Inc., (1992) 
 Jumpin' Jim's Ukulele Tips 'N' Tunes: A Beginner's Method & Songbook, Flea Market Music, Inc., (1994) 
 Jumpin' Jim's Ukulele Gems, Flea Market Music, Inc. (1995) 
 Jumpin' Jim's Ukulele Christmas, Flea Market Music, Inc. (1998) 
 Jumpin' Jim's Gone Hawaiian, Flea Market Music, Inc., (1999) 
 Jumpin' Jim's '60s Uke-In, Flea Market Music, Inc. (1999) 
 Jumpin' Jim's Camp Ukulele, Flea Market Music, Inc. (2000) 
 Jumpin' Jim's Ukulele Beach Party, Flea Market Music, Inc., (2001) 
 Jumpin' Jim's Ukulele Masters: Lyle Ritz, Flea Market Music, Inc. (2001) 
 Jumpin' Jim's Ukulele Masters: Lyle Ritz Solos: 15 Chord Solos Arranged by the Ukulele Jazz Master, Flea Market Music, Inc. (2002) 
 Jumpin' Jim's Ukulele Masters: Herb Ohta, Flea Market Music, Inc., (2002) 
 Jumpin' Jim's Ukulele Spirit, Flea Market Music, Inc. (2002) 
 Jumpin' Jim's Gone Hollywood, Flea Market Music, Inc. (2003) 
 The Ukulele: A Visual History, Backbeat Books, (2d Ed 2003) 
 Jumpin' Jim's Ukulele Masters: John King, The Classical Ukulele, Flea Market Music, Inc. (2004) 
 Jumpin' Jim's Ukulele Island, Flea Market Music, Inc. (2004) 
 Jumpin' Jim's The Bari Best, Flea Market Music, Inc. (2005) 
 Jumpin' Jim's Ukulele Country, Flea Market Music, Inc., (2005) 
 Jumpin' Jim's Happy Holidays, Flea Market Music, Inc. (2006) 
 Ukulele Fretboard Roadmaps, Fred Sokolow/Jim Beloff, Hal Leonard Corporation, (2006) 
 Jumpin' Jim's Ukulele Masters: Lyle Lite: 16 Easy Chord Solos Arranged by Ukulele Jazz Master Lyle Ritz,  Flea Market Music, Inc. (2008) 
 Blues Ukulele, arr. by Fred Sokolow, Flea Market Music, Inc. (2008) 
 Elvis Presley for Ukulele, Hal Leonard Corporation (2009) 
 Disney Songs For Ukulele, Hal Leonard Corporation, (2010) 
 Bluegrass Ukulele, arr. by Fred Sokolow, Flea Market Music, Inc. (2010) 
 The Daily Ukulele, Hal Leonard Corporation and Flea Market Music, Inc, (2010)  (Also available in smaller size)
 Rodgers & Hammerstein For Ukulele, Hal Leonard Corporation (2011) 
 From Lute To Uke, arr. by Tony Mizen, Flea Market Music, Inc. (2011) 
 Broadway Classics For Ukulele, Hal Leonard Corporation (2012) 
 The Baroque Ukulele, arr. by Tony Mizen, Flea Market Music, Inc. (2012) 
 The Daily Ukulele Leap Year Edition, Hal Leonard Corporation and Flea Market Music, (2012) 
 The Daily Ukulele: Baritone Edition, Hal Leonard Corporation and Flea Market Music, (2013) 
 Jazzing Up The Ukulele, Fred Sokolow (2015) 
 The Romantic Ukulele, Tony Mizen, Flea Market Music, (2015)

CDs 

 Jim Beloff, Jim's Dog Has Fleas, Flea Market Music,1993
 Legends Of Ukulele, (producer), Rhino Records 1998
 Jim Beloff For The Love Of Uke, Flea Market Music,1998
 Lyle Ritz, Herb Ohta: A Night Of Ukulele Jazz, (producer) Flea Market Music 2001
 Various Artists, The Finer Things, The Songs Of Herb Ohta & Jim Beloff, Flea Market Music, 2004
 Lyle Ritz, No Frills, (producer) Flea Market Music 2006
 Various Artists, Paradise Lost & Found, Flea Market Music, 2007
 Liz & Jim Beloff, Rare Air, Flea Market Music, 2009
 Dreams I Left In Pockets: 33 Songs By Jim Beloff 2 CD set, 2014 (FMM-1009)

DVD 

 The Joy of Uke - Volume 1, Homespun Tapes 1998
 The Joy of Uke - Volume 2: Moving Beyond the Basics, Homespun Tapes, 2003 
 Lyle's Style: Ukulele Master Lyle Ritz Shares A Lifetime Of Performance Techniques, (producer) Flea Market Music 2009
 Jumpin' Jim's Ukulele Workshop, Homespun, 2011, ASIN: B0057CONAO

References

Publishing companies of the United States